Myxopyrum is a plant genus native to India, southern China, Southeast Asia and New Guinea. There are at present 4 recognized species:

Myxopyrum nervosum Blume - Borneo, Java, Malaysia, Maluku, Sulawesi, Sumatra, New Guinea
subsp. coriaceum (Blume) Kiew - Borneo
subsp. nervosum
Myxopyrum ovatum A.W.Hill - Maluku, the Philippines, New Guinea, Bismarck Archipelago
Myxopyrum pierrei Gagnep. in H.Lecomte - Hainan, Vietnam, Cambodia, Thailand, Borneo
Myxopyrum smilacifolium (Wall.) Blume - Hainan, Bangladesh, Cambodia, India, Assam, Laos, Myanmar, Thailand, Vietnam, Andaman & Nicobar Islands
subsp. confertum (Kerr) P.S.Green - Laos, Thailand, Vietnam
subsp. smilacifolium - Hainan, Assam, Bangladesh, India, Andaman & Nicobar Islands, Myanmar, Thailand, Vietnam

References

External links
Flora of China Illustrations vol. 15, fig. 250, 4, line drawing of Myxopyrum pierrei

Myxopyreae
Oleaceae genera